Remlap is a census-designated place in Blount County, Alabama, United States, located along Alabama State Route 75,  southwest of Oneonta. Remlap has a post office with ZIP code 35133.

Remlap is named for the area's Palmer family; the community's name is "Palmer" spelled backwards.

It was first named as a CDP in the 2020 Census which listed a population of 2,624.

Demographics

2020 census

Note: the US Census treats Hispanic/Latino as an ethnic category. This table excludes Latinos from the racial categories and assigns them to a separate category. Hispanics/Latinos can be of any race.

See also
 List of geographic names derived from anagrams and ananyms

References

Census-designated places in Blount County, Alabama
Census-designated places in Alabama